The flag of Edmonton in Alberta, Canada features the coat of arms on a white square (Canadian pale) surmounting a light blue field.

The colours of the flag, white and blue, symbolize peace and water (for the North Saskatchewan River) respectively. The city flag was first approved by Edmonton City Council on 12 December 1966, designed by artist Norman Yates, ​and was updated in 1986.

In 2016 Mayor Don Iveson supported an effort to adopt a new flag by artist Ryan McCourt and adapting the coat of arms. Due to a lack of support, Iveson abandoned the flag redesign in 2017.

See also

Coat of arms of Edmonton
Flag of Alberta

References

External links
Edmonton City Symbols - City of Edmonton Website (doc)
 

Flag
Flags of cities in Alberta
Edmonton
Flags introduced in 1966
Flags introduced in 1986